The Ghana national beach soccer team represents Ghana in international beach soccer competitions and is controlled by the Ghana Football Association, the governing body for football in Ghana. The team is nicknamed the Black Sharks.

Achievements 

 CAF Beach Soccer Championship Best: seventh place
 2015, 2016

References

External links 

African national beach soccer teams
National sports teams of Ghana